Taram-Uram (she who loves Ur) was a king's daughter and queen at the end of the third millennium BC. She was the daughter of the king of Mari, Apil-kin (about 2126-2091 BCE) and the wife of Shulgi, second king of the Third Dynasty of Ur. The marriage was most likely arranged by Ur-Nammu, father of Shulgi. When coming to Ur she must have changed name. Her birth name is unknown. She was most likely the principal wife of the king in the first years of his reign and might even be the mother of his son and successor Amar-Sin. The latter made death offerings to her father.

References 

21st-century BC people
21st-century BC women
Ancient queens consort
Third Dynasty of Ur